Arthur Spooner (1873–1962) was a British painter from Nottingham, England.

Spooner was born in Nottingham and trained at the Nottingham School of Art (now part of Nottingham Trent University) in the late 19th century. He later taught landscape and figurative painting there in the early 20th century.

Arthur Spooner was a member of the Nottingham Society of Artists. He painted The Goose Fair, Nottingham in 1926. The painting was sold at Christie's in 2004 and is displayed in Nottingham Castle.

See also 
 Nottingham Goose Fair

References 

1873 births
1962 deaths
Artists from Nottingham
Alumni of Nottingham Trent University
Academics of Nottingham Trent University
English landscape painters
British genre painters
20th-century English painters
English male painters
20th-century English male artists